Wild About Nothing is the debut studio album by Helen Hoffner. It was the culmination of ten years work that started in 1982 when Helen joined the band The Astronauts (Stiff Records) with Simon Burton and David Lief. Subsequently, Simon and Helen formed an all-female band called The Marines (CBS/Sony Records) with Denny Jones and Sarah Pritchard; Simon wrote and produced the material and they were managed by Colin Lester. After a couple of minor hit singles and tour support for Kylie Minogue in 1989, it was decided that Helen should become a solo artist. For the next 18 months, Helen and Simon worked on putting her solo album together. They signed to Warner Brothers and began recording in April 1992. Produced by Hugh Padgham and Simon Burton, the album featured Vinnie Colaiuta - drums; Pino Palidino - bass; Dominic Miller - guitar; Bob Marlett and Michael Scherchen - keyboards. The original pressing of the album only had 11 tracks; "Edge of a Dream" (featuring Bryan Adams) was added later on, not having been a part of the original album recording. "Summer of Love", which was a hit in Norway and Finland, has been covered by Faye Wong and numerous other artists. The album sold gold in Finland.

Track listing
 "Wild About Nothing"
 "Summer Of Love"
 "Sacrifice"
 "Holy River"
 "Is There Anybody Out There?"
 "Perfect Day"
 "Lovers Come, Lovers Go"
 "Whispers In The Wind"
 "Papa's Car"
 "Say A Prayer"
 "This Is The Last Time"
 "Edge Of A Dream" (featuring Bryan Adams)

Certifications

References

1993 albums